BC Hospitality Group is a hospitality group based in Copenhagen, Denmark. It is the owner and operator of the Bella Center convention centre as well as a number of hotels.

History
Bella Center opened at Bellahøj in 1965 and was moved to its current location in Amager in 1975. Bella Center inaugurated the 3XM-designed Hotel Bella Sky at a site adjacent to the convention centre in June 2011.

Bella Center and Hotel Bella Sky were both acquired by Solstra Capital Partners in 2012. BC Hospitality Group was established in 2014.

Activities
  Bella Center Copenhagen
 Comwell Conference Center Copenhagen
 Crowne Plaza Copenhagen Towers
 AC Hotel Bella Sky Copenhagen, 
 Copenhagen Marriott Hotel
 360° Venue Catering
 CIFF
 CIFF Showrooms
 International House

Redevelopment of the Bella Center
In early 2014, Solstra Capital and BC Hospitality Group presented an extensive plan for redevelopment of the Bella Center site into a new neighbourhood with offices, housing and other activities. The masterplan was designed by COBE Architects and Vilhelm Lauritzen Arkitekter. Solstra placed the Bella Quarter project in a separate company in 2016.

References

External links
 Official website

Hospitality companies of Denmark
Real estate companies of Denmark
Danish companies established in 2014
Hotel and leisure companies based in Copenhagen
Companies based in Copenhagen Municipality